Cornelius C. Brown Jr. (born June 19, 1980), better known as Neil Brown Jr., is an American actor. His most recognizable role may be in the television series The Walking Dead as Guillermo, leader of the Vatos and as Felix on the short-lived South Beach on the former UPN. He also played DJ Yella in the 2015 biopic, Straight Outta Compton. In 2017 Brown was cast as Ray Perry on the CBS show SEAL Team.

Early life
Brown was born in Orlando, Florida, to Cornelius Brown, a US Marine, and Carrie Brown, an insurance underwriter. In 2000 he married Catrina Robinson Brown and they welcomed two children.

Career
Brown appeared in the martial arts TV series WMAC Masters. He plays the smart-mouthed Marine, Lcpl. Richard "Motown" Guerrero, in the action film Battle: Los Angeles. The movie reunited him with Fast & Furious castmate Michelle Rodriguez where he played Drug Runner and racer Malik Zon.
Neil Brown, Jr played the recurring role of Chad opposite Issa Rae and Yvonne Orji in HBO comedy series Insecure.

Filmography

Film

Television

References

External links
 
 
 

1980 births
20th-century American male actors
21st-century American male actors
African-American male actors
American male film actors
American male television actors
Living people
Male actors from Orlando, Florida
20th-century African-American people
21st-century African-American people